The medial dorsal cutaneous nerve (internal dorsal cutaneous branch) passes in front of the ankle-joint, and divides into two dorsal digital branches, one of which supplies the medial side of the great toe, the other, the adjacent side of the second and third toes.

It also supplies the integument of the medial side of the foot and ankle, and communicates with the saphenous nerve, and with the deep peroneal nerve.

Additional images

References

External links

Nerves of the lower limb and lower torso